Aquone is an unincorporated community in Macon County, North Carolina, United States. Aquone had a post office until it closed on January 12, 1996. The community's name is derived from the Cherokee word egwanul'ti, meaning "by the river".

References

Unincorporated communities in Macon County, North Carolina
Unincorporated communities in North Carolina